KFLY (101.5 FM) is an American commercial country music radio station licensed to Corvallis, Oregon, that serves the Willamette Valley of west-central Oregpn, including Eugene–Springfield, Corvallis–Albany–Lebanon, and Salem.

History
KFLY began broadcasting on October 1, 1966, broadcasting its AM sister station's Top 40 format, as KFLY-FM. In 1979, KFLY-FM changed call letters to KEJO.  Through 1993, 101.5 KEJO had an automated adult contemporary format.  In January 1994, the station changed back to the KFLY call letters and rebranded as "Flight 101" with Jones Radio Network's satellite-fed hot adult contemporary format.  By 2000, the station was branded as "Mix 101-5 KFLY" under Clear Channel's ownership.  After completing its move to KDUK-FM's tower in 2002, vastly increasing coverage, KFLY briefly stunted with quick song clips, and then flipped to active rock as “101-5 K-Fly” broadcasting from Eugene, Oregon.

On July 15, 2015, KFLY's entire airstaff was let go, indicating a format change was imminent. On July 30, 2015, at Noon, KFLY changed its format to adult album alternative, branded as "World Class Rock 101.5".

On June 4, 2017, KFLY dropped its AAA format and began stunting with a text-to-speech countdown (using Microsoft David) to 3 p.m. the following day. At that time, the station flipped to country as "US 101".

The Donkey Show
Until July 15, 2015, The Donkey Show, featured Tanner, Drew, and Marcus; along with their producer Cory, camera guy/audio producer Kirk, Mandy, Carl, and various interns from 2pm - 6pm PT. THE show had a replay hour locally in Eugene from 6pm -7pm called the Donkey Show Rewind. The Donkey Show formerly broadcast on 101.5 FM and 106.3 KZZE FM.  The Donkey Show used the tagline "The only legal donkey show in America."

The Donkey Show covers national and local topics. Includes giveaways, stunts, and comedy bits. The show interview celebrity guests like Gary The Retard, Dennis Hof, and various national comedians. Donkshow.com is the website and the show can be regularly viewed on ustream.tv.

References

External links
KFLY official website

Country radio stations in the United States
FLY
1966 establishments in Oregon
Radio stations established in 1966